Chambolle-Musigny is a commune in the Côte-d'Or département in eastern France.

It is one of the wine villages situated on the Côte-d'Or escarpment, and is one of the twelve Côte d'Or communes of France which added or adopted the name of their best-known vineyard as a suffix to the original name of the village.

Population

Wine

Wine and viticulture is the main business of Chambolle-Musigny. The village name is an Appellation d'origine contrôlée (AOC) for red wine with Pinot noir as the main grape. There are also 25 vineyards classified as Chambolle-Musigny Premier Cru, the most famous of these Les Amoureuses, and two Grand Cru vineyards: Musigny and Bonnes Mares. It is Musigny which has lent its name to the village as a suffix. The trend of adding a vineyard name as a suffix started in 1847 by Gevrey successfully applying to the king to add Chambertin as a suffix to its name. This trend started off as a result of a clever marketing strategy to be able to use the name of the most famous vineyard also as part of the name of simpler wines from the same village. Thus, Chambolle became Chambolle-Musigny in 1882.

Towering high above the other vineyards stands Le Musigny, a 10.86 ha piece of land owned and exploited by no fewer than ten different wine producers. Producers include Domaine Comte Georges de Vogue, Domaine Georges Roumier, Domaine Leroy, Domaine J.-F. Mugnier, Maison Louis Jadot and Maison Joseph Drouhin. It is most famously described as "the queen of all Burgundy" and "an iron fist in a velvet glove". Classed as a Grand Cru vineyard, it is one of two such classed vineyards on the commune.

The other is the majority of Les Bonnes Mares. 13.54 ha lie in Chambolle with a further 1.52 ha technically within neighbouring Morey-Saint-Denis (which like Chambolle adopted the name of one of its four Grands Crus, Saint-Denis). Bonnes Mares is generally considered to be firmer and more tannic. Most producers of Musigny also happen to own or exploit land in Bonnes Mares.

There are two dozen Premier Cru vineyards, most at least of good quality. One bears special mention, however. Les Amoureuses, a small 5.4 ha climat is considered better than the other 23 Premiers Crus. It is generally considered to be a very close sibling to Musigny itself, with perhaps less longevity and less all-out power; but one which is closer in style to Musigny than Bonnes Mares. The wines tend to be very expensive like a Grand Cru as well and most producers blessed enough to own a parcel of this tiny vineyard enjoy high incomes.

Photo gallery

International relations
Chambolle-Musigny is twinned with:
 Schwabenheim an der Selz, Germany
Sister City with:
 Sonoma, California, United States

See also
 French wine
 Route des Grands Crus

References

Communes of Côte-d'Or